

The Hidalgo Texas Port of Entry is located at the northern end of the McAllen–Hidalgo–Reynosa International Bridge, in the city of Hidalgo, Hidalgo County, Texas.

The northbound traffic is coming from the city of Reynosa in Tamaulipas state of Mexico.  Since 1996, all northbound trucks are required to use the Pharr–Reynosa International Bridge to enter the U.S. from Reynosa.

Although located in Hidalgo, the U.S. section of the McAllen–Hidalgo–Reynosa International Bridge is operated by the larger city of McAllen nearby to the north.

History
Prior to 1926, primitive ferry service existed between the cities via rowboat.

The McAllen–Hidalgo–Reynosa International Bridge was the first connecting the cities of Hidalgo and Reynosa, and was built in 1926.

The Anzalduas International Bridge, opened in 2009, is the next upriver bridge between Reynosa and the McAllen metro area. The Pharr–Reynosa International Bridge is the next downriver.

See also
 
 List of Mexico–United States border crossings
 List of Canada–United States border crossings

References

Mexico–United States border crossings
Buildings and structures in Hidalgo County, Texas
Transportation in McAllen, Texas
Transportation in Hidalgo County, Texas
Reynosa
1905 establishments in Texas